The M266 is a Mercedes-Benz inline-4 engine manufactured in Stuttgart and is used solely in vehicles like the A-class and B-class. The most powerful engine in the family is the 2.0 turbo, found in the Mercedes-Benz B200 Turbo.

See also
 List of Mercedes-Benz engines

M266